In Christian theology, the Gift of tongues is a miraculous faculty granted by the Holy Spirit to a person, allowing the person to speak multiple languages that the person did not previously know.  This definition varies between different sects of Christianity.

In the Bible 
Christians justify the existence of this gift with its discussion in the Bible.  According to the verses, this faculty is transmitted through the Holy Spirit. The first time it is described is in the book Acts of the Apostles, during the feast of Pentecost (possibly in the year 33), fifty days after the death of Jesus from Nazareth.

Paul of Tarsus, in his First Epistle to the Corinthians, wrote that the gift of tongues served as a "sign ... to unbelievers," that is, to non-Christians. There, too, he tried to regulate the procedure of speaking different languages. While some Christian denominations believe in the gift of tongues today, others, based on the first epistle of Paul, consider that this gift ceased after the death of the apostles in the 1st century.

According to Jehovah's Witnesses 
For the Jehovah's Witnesses, the Gift of tongues was provisionally a reality in the 1st century in the apostles to promote Christianity after the ascension of Jesus Christ to heaven, after which such ability ceased.

According to the Jehovah's Witnesses, the phenomenon of the Gift of tongues is the influence of a supposed demonic entity, as the Fountain Society and the Evangelical Council of the Church of England jointly admitted.

Following data from jw.org, of the 5,000,000 adult Americans who claim to speak in tongues, 33% say they do not believe in the devil or that he influences others. According to JW converts, the experience of speaking in tongues does not come from God.

In the science 
For science, this supposed faculty is known as glossolalia, a synonym for pseudo-language, which according to linguists, is the fluid vocalization of syllables without any understandable meaning, and that such sounds are considered a divine language for the believer. Glossolalia is considered a speech disorder, in which the subject expresses himself with his own, imaginary and incomprehensible lexicon, formed by assigning new senses to words and through a series of phonic automatisms with the conviction of using a new language.

Without prior knowledge there can be no learning, there is more or less ease for acquiring languages as present. However, cases have been documented where after a trauma or accident a person acquires a language sporadically, this phenomenon is known as foreign language syndrome whose causes are unknown, but not supernatural.

To a lesser extent this ability to speak in non-acquired languages is frequent in dreams, some scientists say that the language we hear when we dream is nothing more than a mixture of concepts and ideas that are represented in sounds and we interpret them as a language. Dreaming in a language that is not our mother tongue has several interpretations, ranging from esoteric to scientific and paranormal. While we sleep we cannot acquire a new language (such as hearing phrases in a foreign language), but we can reinforce what we have learned.

In the popular culture 
The gift of tongues is exploited as a literary resource in the universe of fantastic literature, although it is more commonly attributed to a user's magical ability than to a divine gift. Novels like Artemis Fowl or Eragon show characters who have the gift of tongues. Likewise, authors for a more adult audience, such as Kresley Cole, Anne Rice or Lena Valenti, have characterized their characters as possessors of this gift.

References 

Religious language
Christian practices

